The Camelback Bridge is a restored historic wooden bridge that arches over the Constitution Trail in Normal, Illinois.  It is on the U.S. National Register of Historic Places. The bridge's main span is a wooden kingpost pony truss. The bridge is supported by Phoenix columns, a type of wrought iron column that was patented by the Phoenix Iron Company in 1862. It is one of only two bridges in Illinois using the columns.

History
The bridge was built by the Illinois Central Railroad around the 1880s to allow traffic on Virginia Avenue to pass over its railroad line. The Phoenix columns were likely salvaged from another Illinois Central bridge which crossed the Illinois River at LaSalle. When the railroad stopped using the tracks, the original form was no longer needed, and during the rehabilitation, the bridge was rebuilt to a lower height to allow easier access to vehicles.

References

External links

 Town of Normal Historic Preservation

Buildings and structures in Bloomington–Normal
Road bridges on the National Register of Historic Places in Illinois
National Register of Historic Places in McLean County, Illinois
Bridges completed in the 1880s
Wooden bridges in Illinois
Transportation buildings and structures in McLean County, Illinois